The Advisory Committee for Aeronautics (ACA) was a UK agency founded on 30 April 1909, to undertake, promote, and institutionalize aeronautical research. In 1919 it was renamed the Aeronautical Research Committee, later becoming the Aeronautical Research Council.

Following the establishment of this committee, other countries created similar agencies, notably the French L’Etablissement Central de l’Aérostation Militaire in Meudon (now ONERA), the Russian "Aerodynamic Institute of Koutchino" and the U.S.A.'s National Advisory Committee for Aeronautics, founded in 1915.

The Aeronautical Research Council was disbanded in 1979.

Origins

The idea for the creation of the ACA originated with the then Secretary of State for War, R.B.Haldane (later First Viscount Haldane), who was supported in his efforts by the Prime Minister of the United Kingdom H. H. Asquith.

Asquith announced the committee's appointment in a statement to the House of Commons on 5 May 1909, in which he stated:"With a view to securing that the highest scientific talent shall he brought to hear on the problems which will have to be solved in the course of the work of the two departments, the National Physical Laboratory has been requested to organize at its establishment at Teddington a special department for continuous investigation, experimental and otherwise,of questions which must from time to time be solved in order to obtain adequate guidance in construction."For the superintendence of the investigations at the National Physical Laboratory and for general advice on the scientific problems arising in connection with the work of the Admiralty and War Office in aerial construction and navigation, I have appointed a special Committee...."

Haldane was criticised for what some considered the undue preponderance of academics on the committee (7 of the original 10 members were Fellows of the premier British learned society for science, the Royal Society, founded in 1660). To these criticisms Asquith replied in the House of Commons:"It is no part of the general duty of the Advisory Committee For Aeronautics either to construct or invent. Its function is not to initiate, but to consider what is initiated elsewhere, and is referred to it by the executive officers of the Navy and Army Construction Departments. The problems which are likely to arise ... for solutions are numerous, and it will be the work of the Committee to advise on these problems, and to seek their solution by the application of both theoretical and experimental methods of research".

History

The Advisory Committee For Aeronautics proceeded to coordinate research in the following years and produced a series of annual reports, the first of which summarised the purpose of the committee as "the scientific study of the problems of flight, with a view to their practical solution". It was kept out of the political ambit of any one ministry, reporting directly to the Prime Minister and receiving its funds from the "Civil Service Estimate". This arrangement changed with the creation of the Royal Air Force, after which it reported to the Secretary of State for Air.

"Annual Technical Reports" were produced by the committee from 1910 until 1919, at which time its name was changed to the "Aeronautical Research Committee". From 1920 reports were made to the Air Ministry. In addition, technical papers known as "Reports & Memoranda" (R&M) were produced.

The Aeronautical Research Committee's scope was both military and civil applications.

During the deteriorating international situation of the 1930s (see Events preceding World War II in Europe), the committee was given fresh impetus with the appointment of Sir Henry Tizard. He formed the Committee for the Scientific Survey of Air Defence. One of the committee's most important decisions was to speed the development of a national system of air defence based on radar.

In 1945 after the Second World War the committee's name was changed to "Aeronautical Research Council" and the Council reported directly to the Ministry of Supply. Annual reports were replaced by collections of R&Ms, the last issue appearing in 1972.

The Aeronautical Research Council was disbanded in 1979.

A brief history of the committee during its seventy years of existence is maintained online by Cranfield University, who also maintain an archive of the R&M series, which shows the many aspects of aviation which were the subject of research during the period.

Initial members of the Committee 
From the time of its appointment on 30 April 1909 until the publication of its first report, the committee's members were as follows:

Publications

The committee and its successor agencies published several series of reports which could be purchased from HMSO:

 Annual Reports (the first covering the year from 1909 to 1910)
 Technical Reports
 Reports and Memoranda (referred to as R&Ms).
 Current Papers (starting in 1950 with No. 1)
An index to R&Ms was issued periodically e.g. R&M 2750 published in 1956, covering papers from the late 1940s onwards (Index issues' R&M numbers were generally assigned with the last two digits being '50': this system was also adopted for Current Papers, starting with CP No. 50 ).

Footnotes and references

Further reading
 David Bloor. 2011. The Enigma of the Aerofoil: Rival theories in aerodynamics, 1909–1930. University of Chicago Press.
 Alex Roland. 1985. Model Research: The National Advisory Committee for Aeronautics, 1915–1958. 2 vols. Washington, DC: Scientific and Technical Information Branch, NASA.

1909 establishments in the United Kingdom
1979 disestablishments in the United Kingdom
Organizations established in 1909
Organizations disestablished in 1979
Aeronautics organizations
Aviation history of the United Kingdom
Aviation organisations based in the United Kingdom
H. H. Asquith